Ntuusi is a settlement in the Central Region of Uganda.

Location
The coordinates of Ntuusi are 00°03'00.0"N, 31°12'04.0"E (Latitude:0.050000; Longitude:31.201111).

Overview
Ntuusi is the location of the headquarters of Ntuusi sub-county in Lwemiyaga County, Sembabule District. This area, also known as Bigo bya Mugenyi, is the earliest evidence of organised human settlement in the African Great Lakes Region.

See also
List of cities and towns in Uganda
Mawogola County

References

Populated places in Uganda
Cities in the Great Rift Valley